2015 Faroe Islands Premier League was the 73rd season of top-tier football on the Faroe Islands. For sponsorship reasons, it was known as Effodeildin. B36 Tórshavn were the defending champions, having won their tenth Faroese title last season.

Teams

Skála and B68 had finished 9th and 10th respectively at the end of the previous season and were relegated to the 1. deild as a result.

Replacing them were the 1. deild champions TB and runners-up FC Suðuroy.

Team summaries

Note

Managerial changes

League table

Positions by round

Results

Regular home games

Additional home games

Top goalscorers

Hat-tricks

1 Scored four goals.

References

 
Faroe Islands Premier League seasons
1
Faroe
Faroe